Alamode Island, once known as Terra Firma Island, is the largest and southeasternmost of the Terra Firma Islands, with steep rocky cliffs surmounted by a rock and snow cone rising to , lying in Marguerite Bay off the west coast of Graham Land. First visited and surveyed by the British Graham Land Expedition under John Riddoch Rymill in 1936. So named by the Falkland Islands Dependencies Survey, following a 1948 resurvey, for its supposed resemblance to an à la mode confection (with a scoop of ice cream on it).

See also 
 List of Antarctic and sub-Antarctic islands

References
 

Islands of Graham Land
Fallières Coast